ROCS Tian Dan (PFG2-1110) is the eighth ship of the  guided-missile frigates of the Republic of China Navy (ROCN), which was based on the  of the United States Navy. Tian Dan was intended to be the first hull of the second batch of the class, with improved armament and electronics. However, delays in the development of the weapon systems and electronics led to the second batch being cancelled. In 1999, the first ship of the second batch was re-ordered to the standard design with all the improvements to the design. The ship was constructed beginning in 2001 by the China Shipbuilding Corporation in Taiwan and the frigate was launched in 2002 and entered service with the ROCN in 2004. In 2014, Tian Dan was among the Taiwanese vessels sent to assist in the search for the missing Malaysia Airlines MH370 flight.

Design and description
The Cheng Kung class are based on the long-hulled version of the s of the United States Navy but with modifications. The class was intended to be built in two batches, with Batch I built to the standard design, and Batch II constructed to an improved design, incorporating new technologies. They are powered by two General Motors LM-2500 gas turbines turning one shaft connected to a controllable pitch propeller, creating . They also have two drop-down auxiliary propulsion units that create . The ships have four 1,000 kW diesel alternator sets for generating electricity. For additional stability in heavy seas, the ships have fin stabilizers. The frigates have a crew of 206 including 13 officers and an air group of 19.

The frigates were initially armed with eight Hsiung Feng II SSMs placed in two box launchers located atop the superstructure aft of the bridge. They also mounted a Mark 13 launcher for 40 RIM-66 Standard MR surface-to-air missiles. They have an OTO Melara /62 dual-purpose naval gun situated forward and two single-mounted Bofors /L70 guns. the 40 mm guns cannot be crewed while the 76 mm gun is firing due to blast effects. The Cheng Kung class mounts a /76 Phalanx close-in weapon system (CIWS) atop the hangar. Flanking the CIWS atop the hangar are two Type 75 20 mm/75 guns. For ASW, the frigates are armed with two triple-mounted  Mk 32 torpedo tubes for Mark 46 torpedoes.

The ships mount SPS-55 surface search radar, SPS-49(V)5 air search, Mark 92 fire control radar, STIR 24 missile fire control radar and Mark 90 Phalanx fire control radar. They are also equipped with DE 1160B hull-mounted sonar and are capable of using the ATAS towed passive sonar or the SQR-18A towed sonar. For electronic countermeasures, they mount the Chang Feng IV suite, which consists of the SLQ-32(V)5 radar warning system and the Sidekick radar jammer,  and the SLQ-25 Nixie torpedo decoy system.  The ships are equipped with the Prairie-Masker acoustic signature reduction system. The  ships came designed with a hangar and aft helicopter deck capable of operating two helicopters. However, the ROCN had difficulty acquiring helicopters capable of operating from the class until they obtained the S-70C Thunderhawk helicopters from the United States. Though capable of operating two, only one is kept housed aboard the frigates. The ships use the Recovery Assist, Secure and Traverse (RAST) haul-down system for their helicopters.

Upgrades
The displacement of the Cheng Kung-clas frigates has varied over time.

The Cheng Kung class was initially fitted with eight Hsiung Feng II SSMs, instead of the Harpoon missiles that the Oliver Hazard Perry class used. Ships of the class began refitting with four Hsiung Feng III (HF III) missiles, replacing four of the Hsiung Feng II missiles after the new HF III missiles entered production. In addition, the ROCN ordered Harpoon missiles for use by the Cheng Kungs in September 2000. After the US stopped supporting the SM-1 and their associated launch system support was taken up by NCSIST which also implemented an upgrade program for the missiles. Upgrades to the SM-1 include a better rocket motor and an active seeker.

The class's Mk 75 main guns have been upgraded and have an improved firing rate of 100 rounds a minute.

Construction and career 
Tian Dan was initially ordered as the first ship of the second batch of the Cheng Kung class. However, the second batch was cancelled in October 1994. The ship was re-ordered from the China Shipbuilding Corporation at Kaoshuing, Taiwan, as a continuation of Batch I in January 1999, but funding for the vessel did not become available until December 2000. The frigate was laid down on 21 December 2001 and was launched on 15 October 2002. Named for a famous Chinese commander, the ship was commissioned on 11 March 2004. The Cheng Kung-class frigates make up the ROCN 146th Frigate Squadron.

On 14 March 2014, Tian Dan, along with two of Taiwan's Coastguard patrol vessels, arrived in the South China Sea between Malaysia and Vietnam to join the multi-national search and rescue operation for the missing Malaysia Airlines MH370 flight.

Gallery

See also
 Republic of China Navy

Notelist

Citations

References
 
 
 

Cheng Kung-class frigates
Ships built in the Republic of China
2002 ships
Frigates of the Republic of China